The Autotrain was a type of passenger train used in the early 20th century, where the steam locomotive could be remotely controlled from the rear of the train. This meant that the engine would not have to run-around at the end of a journey before returning. These trains were also known as motor trains or railmotors at the time, but the term railmotor is now used to refer to trains where the steam engine was integrated into the coach.

A driving cab in the rearmost coach (known as an autocoach or auto trailer) has controls to allow the driver to operate the regulator, brake and whistle when driving the train 'in reverse'. The fireman would remain on the engine in order to stoke the fire and to take off the brakes, as the driver could only apply them.

Autotrains could operate with one or two coaches: either with the locomotive at the front or rear of the formation, or sandwiched between the two driving coaches.

Autotrains were being used by most rail companies in Great Britain by the 1920s, and were particularly common on branch line services. They remained in widespread use until the 1950s and 1960s, when they were replaced by diesel multiple units (DMUs). They were in effect the ancestor of the modern driving trailers.

See also 

 GWR Autocoach
 Multiple unit
 Push-pull train
 Railmotor
 New Zealand motor train
 Voiture État à 2 étages – French double-decker equivalent

Passenger rail rolling stock
Passenger rail transport in the United Kingdom